The ENSIAME (École Nationale Supérieure d'Ingénieurs en Informatique Automatique Mécanique Énergétique et Électronique) is one of the French "grandes écoles" of Engineering. It is located in the city of Valenciennes, in the north of France.

Born from the merger between the ENSIMEV, the EIGIP and the ISIV, it educates every-year 200 engineers in 3 areas: 

 Mechanics-Energetics
 Computing and Management of Systems
 Mechatronics

It offers additional courses which complement the engineering courses.

 A Master's specialised in Rail and Transport Systems
 A Diploma in Technological Research (D.R.T)

External links 
ENSIAME Homepage
University of Valenciennes
Valenciennes City Web page

Engineering universities and colleges in France
Education in Valenciennes
Grandes écoles
2002 establishments in France
Buildings and structures in Valenciennes